Germa Seyum was King of Zagwe dynasty. Taddesse Tamrat states that he was a son of Mara Takla Haymanot, the younger brother of King Tatadim, and the father of Pentewudem, Kedus Harbe and Gebre Mesqel Lalibela. His name does not appear in the longer king lists.

References 

11th-century monarchs in Africa
Emperors of Ethiopia
Zagwe dynasty